The Ministry of Rural Development and Food is the government department that oversees agriculture in Greece.

History
The ministry was established in 2004 upon the inauguration of the First Cabinet of Kostas Karamanlis, replacing the older Ministry of Agriculture.

It was demoted to the level of a sub-ministry within the Ministry of Productive Reconstruction, the Environment and Energy in the First Cabinet of Alexis Tsipras, before being restored as a full ministry in his second cabinet a few months later.

List of Ministers of Rural Development and Food (2004–2015)

List of Alternate Ministers of Rural Development and Food (January–September 2015)

List of Ministers of Rural Development and Food (since September 2015)

Agencies
 Plant Health Inspection Service
 The Benaki Phytopathological Institute conducts research in plant protection and plant health. It was founded with a donation by Emmanouil Benakis and so is named after him.

References

External links
 Official website

Government ministries of Greece
Lists of government ministers of Greece
Greece
Agricultural organizations based in Greece
2004 establishments in Greece
Ministries established in 2004